Claudio Casciolini (Rome 9 November 1697 – Rome 18 January 1760) was an Italian composer.

Life
The son of Agostino and Veronica Finocchiola, he was born in Rome on November. From April 1726 until his death he sang bass at the church of San Lorenzo in Damaso where he may also have been maestro di cappella. On 14 Jan. 1724 he married Maria Teresa Mazza in the basilica of S. Lorenzo in Damaso; he had numerous children and lived in poverty in a small house near the :it:Piazza della Chiesa Nuova. He was a member of the Congregation of S. Cecilia, for which he wrote various compositions.

Work
Casciolini wrote only church music. Although he lived during the period of baroque music he wrote exclusively in the antique Stile antico. This consisted of a cappella counterpoint in the style of Palestrina.

Compositions
His compositions include a three-part Missa pro defunctis, and a Missa brevissima.

Other works for four voices 
Venite comedite; Adiuva nos; Responsoria per il Mercoledi, Giovedi, Venerdi Santo; Benedictus; Christus factus est, Vexilla; Christe cum sit; Istorum est; Miserere; O vos omnes; Laude sagra ad honorem et gloriam Domini nostri Jesu Christi; Pange lingua; Stabat Mater; Viam mandatorum.

Other works for eight parts 
Angelus Domini; Beatus vir; Dixit Dominus; Zachee festinans descende.

References

External links
 
 

1697 births
1760 deaths
Italian male classical composers
Italian Baroque composers
18th-century Italian composers
18th-century Italian male musicians